Among the 22 teams that participated in the 2013 Vuelta a España, 19 were UCI World Tour teams, and 3 were Professional Continental teams. The list below contains 198 cyclists entered in the 2013 Vuelta a España, which began on 22 August and finished on 15 September.


Teams 

*: Pro Continental teams given wild card entry to this event.

By rider

By nationality

See also 
 2013 Vuelta a España

References

External links 
 

2013 Vuelta a España
2013